The Secretary of War and Navy was a member of the federal executive cabinet as well as a high-ranking officer with the responsibility of commanding the Mexican Army and Mexican Navy (including the Naval Infantry Corps). The secretary is appointed by the President of the Republic.

List of officeholders

See also
 Secretariat of National Defense (Mexico)
 Secretariat of the Navy

References

External links
 

War
Military of Mexico
Mexico

es:Anexo:Secretarios de la Defensa Nacional